Rimi may refer to:

 Rimi, Nepal, a village development committee
 Rimi, Nigeria, a Local Government Area of Katsina State
 Rimi (Norway), a Norwegian grocery store chain
 Rimi Baltic, a Baltic retail chain
 Rimi, another name for aurochs, an extinct wild cattle species
 Rimi B. Chatterjee (born 1969), Indian author
 Rimi Natsukawa (born 1973), Japanese singer
 Rimi Nishimoto (born 1994), Japanese voice actress
 Rimi Sen (born 1981), Indian actress and film producer
 Abba Musa Rimi (born 1940), Nigerian politician
 Aisha Rimi, Nigerian attorney, entrepreneur and advocate of women and children's rights
 Simeen Hussain Rimi, 21st century Bangladeshi politician